Yasin Avcı may refer to:

 Yasin Avcı (footballer born 1983), Turkish footballer
 Yasin Avcı (footballer born 1984), Turkish footballer